Flights of Fantasy is a collectible card game.

Publication history
Flights of Fantasy is an out-of-print fantasy trading card art set that was turned into a collectible card game near the end of its development and marketed as a "Collectors Card Set & Game". The game is technically the second CCG ever released, however it's not considered a serious contender. It was published by Destini Productions and was released in September 1994.

Description
The set had 118 cards and was sold only in booster packs. The game is generally not considered the second CCG released after Magic: the Gathering because of its gimmicky nature. The game mechanics appear to be "grafted on" and merely an afterthought, and it lacks a uniform card back. All card back art was created by Ed Beard Jr. According to Beard, as a "first collector card/game" it began production in May 1992.

The card art was designed specifically to match a storyline, featuring "novel-like" card backs. The game claimed to feature "quick and fierce" battles based on the story, and could be played a variety of ways. According to Scrye magazine from 1995, the game was to be released mid-December of 1995 in boxes consisting of 36 booster packs with 10 cards.

Reception
Scrye noted that the gameplay element was a "very minor" part to what was essentially a "card art set" and appeared to be "grafted on" and was about to fun to play as "doing your taxes".

References

Collectible card games
Card games introduced in 1994